Ronnie Shields is an American football tight end who is currently a free agent. He played college football at Kentucky.

Early years
Ronnie Shields was born in Los Angeles to Ron and Victoria Shields. Shields attended Stephenson high school in Stone Mountain and graduated in 2010. While at Stephenson high school Ronnie didn't begin playing football until his junior year.

College career
Shields committed to University of Kentucky on October 30, 2009, and enrolled in June 2010. Shields was enrolled at Kentucky from 2010 to 2014.

Professional career
Shields went undrafted in the 2015 NFL draft. Shields participated the Seattle Seahawks rookie minicamp in May but was not signed.

On January 4, 2016, Shields signed a futures contract with the Seattle Seahawks. On May 4, 2016, the Seahawks waived Shields. Shields was later re-signed May 9, 2016. On August 20, 2016, Shields was waived by the Seahawks with an injury designation.

References

External links
Seattle Seahawks bio
Kentucky Wildcats bio

Living people
American football tight ends
Seattle Seahawks players
Sportspeople from DeKalb County, Georgia
People from Stone Mountain, Georgia
Players of American football from Los Angeles
Kentucky Wildcats football players
Players of American football from Georgia (U.S. state)
1991 births